was a Japanese football player. He played for Japan national team.

Club career
Sano was born in Shizuoka Prefecture on September 21, 1912. He played for Waseda WMW was consisted of his alma mater Waseda University players and graduates.

National team career

In 1936, when Sano was a Waseda University student, he was selected Japan national team for 1936 Summer Olympics in Berlin. At this competition, on August 4, he debuted against Sweden. Japan completed a come-from-behind victory against Sweden. The first victory in Olympics for the Japan and the historic victory over one of the powerhouses became later known as "Miracle of Berlin" (ベルリンの奇跡) in Japan. In 2016, this team was selected Japan Football Hall of Fame. On August 7, he also played against Italy. He played 2 games for Japan in 1936.

Sano died on March 26, 1992 at the age of 79.

National team statistics

References

External links

 
 Japan National Football Team Database
Japan Football Hall of Fame (Japan team at 1936 Olympics) at Japan Football Association
 Rihei Sano's profile at Sports Reference.com

1912 births
1992 deaths
Waseda University alumni
Association football people from Shizuoka Prefecture
Japanese footballers
Japan international footballers
Olympic footballers of Japan
Footballers at the 1936 Summer Olympics
Association football goalkeepers